Raido Villers (born November 28, 1982 in Jõhvi, Estonia) is a former Estonian professional  basketballer. He spent his whole career with the BC Rakvere Tarvas. He retired from the professional basketball after achieving first medals in the Korvpalli Meistriliiga and Estonian Basketball Cup in 2010 and 2011 respectively.

Honours 
Estonian Basketball League:
Runner-up: 2009-10
Estonian Basketball Cup:
Runner-up: 2010-11

External links
 Profile at basket.ee

1982 births
Living people
Estonian men's basketball players
Korvpalli Meistriliiga players
People from Jõhvi
Small forwards